Amicale Sportive Châtaigneraie Vendée Football (commonly referred to as AS La Châtaigneraie, La Châtaigneraie, or simply La Chât) is a French football club based in La Châtaigneraie in the Pays de la Loire region. The club was founded on 8 April 1925 and currently plays in the sixth tier of French football, after being relegated from 2021–22 Championnat National 3.

References

External links
 Official site

Association football clubs established in 1925
1925 establishments in France
Football clubs in Pays de la Loire
Sport in Vendée